Wet Dreams 2 is a 2005 South Korean film. Comedic but more serious than its predecessor Wet Dreams, it follows four girls in high school as they become curious about sex and compete for the affection of their new teacher.

Plot

Sung-eun (Song Eun-chae), her friends Soo-yeon (Jeon Hye-bin) and Mi-sook (Park Seul-ki) likes boys until Sung-eun pursues after someone with more experience. She becomes attracted to new student teacher Kang Bong-goo (Lee Ji-hoon) and pursues Bong-goo. But what she doesn't realize about Bong-goo, is that he passes gas when aroused.

Cast
 Lee Ji-hoon - Kang Bang-goo
 Song Eun-chae - Oh Sung-eun
 Jeon Hye-bin - Park Soo-yeon
 Park Seul-gi - Kim Mi-sook
 Shin Joo-ah - Baek Se-mi
 Jeon Jae-hyeong - Ji Suk-goo
 Park Kil-soo - AIDS/Chan Sung-bok
 Kim Ji-young - Biology teacher
 Park Ye-jin - Bride (Sung-eun's older sister)
 Kim Do-yeon - Member of the tango dance team
 Kim Hae-sook - Sung-eun's mom
 Jung Dong-hwan - Sung-eun's dad
 Jeong Yu-mi - Class president
 Park Chae-kyeong - 2nd year-3 class student
 Lee Min-jung - 2nd year-3 class student
 Son Yeo-eun - 2nd year-3 class student
 Cho Hanna - 2nd year-3 class student
 Lee Soo-kyung - Wedding guest
 Ko Ho-kyeong - Da-eun
 Lee Ho-young - Student teacher

References

External links 
 
 
 

2005 films
2000s Korean-language films
2000s sex comedy films
South Korean sex comedy films
South Korean sequel films
2005 comedy films
2000s South Korean films